N-Phenethyl-14-ethoxymetopon is a drug that is a derivative of metopon. It is a potent analgesic, around 60 times stronger than morphine and produces significantly less constipation.

N-Phenethyl-14-ethoxymetopon acts as an agonist at both μ- and δ-opioid receptors, with a Ki of 0.16nM at μ and 3.14nM at δ.

See also 
 14-Cinnamoyloxycodeinone
 14-Phenylpropoxymetopon
 7-PET
 MR-2096
 N-Phenethylnormorphine
 Phenomorphan
 RAM-378
 Ro4-1539

References 

Delta-opioid receptor agonists
4,5-Epoxymorphinans
Phenols
Ketones
Ethers
Mu-opioid receptor agonists
Semisynthetic opioids